Club Social Deportivo Vendaval is a professional soccer team of the El Salvadorian city of Apopa.

History
In 2012, the club was forced to merge with Chalatenango to form Chalatenango-Vendaval because of financial difficulties and they currently play in the second division. However after one season, In 2013 the partnership between Chalatenango and Vendaval ended and they split into two teams again, with Vendaval remaining in the Second division while Chalatenango descended to the third division.

Honours

Domestic honours
 Segunda División Salvadorean and predecessors 
 Champions (1) : TBD
 Tercera División Salvadorean and predecessors 
 Champions:(1) :

Club Records

Top goalscorers 

<small>Note: Players in bold text are still active with Vendaval </small>

Stadium
Vendaval plays its home games at Estadio Joaquin Gutierrez in Apopa.

 Estadio Joaquin Gutierrez (1983-Present)
 Estadio Luis Amílcar Moreno; San Francisco Gotera (1995) Vendaval was suspended for two games from their home stadium and forced to play at Estadio Luis Amilcar Morneo.

Current squadAs of:Squad changes
In:
  TBD – Transferred from Free Agent
  TBD – Transferred from Free Agent

Out:
  TBA – Transferred to'' TBA

Notable players
Note: this list includes players that have appeared in at least 100 league games and/or have earned international caps.

Coaching staff

Management

Managerial history

References

Football clubs in El Salvador
1927 establishments in El Salvador
Association football clubs established in 1927